Ebenezer Pettigrew (March 10, 1783 – July 8, 1848) was a Congressional Representative from North Carolina. He was born near Plymouth, North Carolina, March 10, 1783. He studied under tutors at home and later attended the University of North Carolina at Chapel Hill where he was a charter member of the Debating Society, which became the Dialectic and Philanthropic Societies. He was a planter slaveholder, and later became a member of the State senate in 1809 and 1810. He was elected as an Anti-Jacksonian to the Twenty-fourth Congress (March 4, 1835 – March 3, 1837), afterwards resuming his agricultural pursuits. He was also a slave owner. He died at Magnolia Plantation on Lake Scuppernong, July 8, 1848, and was interred in the family cemetery.

He was the father of Confederate General J. Johnston Pettigrew.

References

Bibliography 
 Twenty-fourth United States Congress
 Wall, Bennett H. “Ebenezer Pettigrew’s Efforts to Control the Marketing of his Crops.” Agricultural History 27 (October 1953): 123–32.
 U.S. Congress Biographical Directory
 Pettigrew Family Papers (#592), in the Southern Historical Collection, University of North Carolina at Chapel Hill.

1783 births
1848 deaths
National Republican Party members of the United States House of Representatives from North Carolina
19th-century American politicians
People from Plymouth, North Carolina
American slave owners